Rithā’ al-Andalus (variously translated as "An Elegy to al-Andalus" or "Elegy for the fall of al-Andalus"), also known as Lament for the Fall of Seville, is an Arabic qaṣīda nūniyya which is said to have been written by Andalusi poet Abu al-Baqa ar-Rundi in 1267, "on the fate of al-Andalus after the loss, in 664/1266, of several places in the provinces of Murcia and Jerez" to the Christian kingdoms during the Reconquista.

This poem is considered the most significant of a series of poems that were written in the classical tradition of rithā’ (which denotes both lamentation and a literary genre in itself) by Andalusi poets who had been inspired by the Reconquista. Ar-Rundi makes notable use of personification as a rhetorical device.

Context and purpose
Ar-Rundi lived through the fall of most of the major Andalusi cities—such as Cadiz, Cordoba, Seville (mentioned as "Hims"), and others—to the forces of the Catholic monarchs: Alfonso VIII of Castile and his grandson Ferdinand III, Sancho VII of Navarre, and Peter II of Aragon. Most major Andalusi cities fell within the span of a century with the collapse of the Almohad Caliphate.

Ar-Rundi composed his poem mourning the fall of al-Andalus and calling the Islamic kingdoms on the North African shore, particularly the Marinid Sultanate, when the king of Granada started to concede towns and castles to the Crown of Castille.

Composition
The poem is a nūniyya, as virtually all of its couplets end in an alveolar nasal—either from the letter  (nun) or from nunation. The opening line alludes to that of the famous nūniyya of Abu al-Fath al-Busti: 

The poem is full of allusions to figures and symbols from the depths of Arab and Middle Eastern culture. It mentions ancient Arab tribes such as ʿĀd, Shaddad, and Qahtan, as well as quasi-mythic historical figures such as Sasan, Korah, Sayf ibn Dhi Yazan, Darius the Great, and Solomon, asking: "Where are they now?"

In the poem, the speaker eulogizes the fallen cities one by one, using religious symbols to concretize the impending, menacing threat of the Catholics' invasion. The speaker mentions the minbars and the mihrabs that "mourn" beside the bells and crucifixes in the mosques that were transformed into churches.

Cultural references 
N3rdistan, led by Walid Ben Selim, performed this poem in a musical arrangement in 2014.

References

Sources

 
 
 
 
 

Arabic poems
Reconquista
Literature of Al-Andalus